Avenel may refer to:

Avenel, Victoria, Australia
Avenel railway station
Avenel-Hillandale, Maryland, a historic place near Washington, D.C.
Avenel, New Jersey, United States
Avenel (NJT station)
Avenel (Bedford, Virginia), a NRHP listing in Bedford, Virginia
Avenel Cooperative Housing Project, a historic cooperative housing project in Silver Lake, Los Angeles, California
TPC Potomac at Avenel Farms, a golf course in Potomac, Maryland
The Avenel family of Scotland, including Robert Avenel